The Ligier JS P2 is a racing car designed and built by French manufacturer Onroak Automotive and named in partnership with French former racing driver Guy Ligier.  Designed for the Le Mans Prototype 2 (LMP2) regulations, it is intended as a second option to Onroak's Morgan LMP2 that has been competing since 2012.  As well as being the first closed-cockpit car offered by Onroak, it is also the first car they designed entirely in-house.  The JS P2 debuted at the 2014 24 Hours of Le Mans, and has been campaigned in the FIA World Endurance Championship, European Le Mans Series, Asian Le Mans Series and IMSA WeatherTech SportsCar Championship.

Development
Onroak initially planned to develop a car for the Le Mans Prototype 1 category but cancelled these plans to concentrate on the LMP2 category.  The design was seen by Onroak as marketable in North America where closed-cockpit designs, which were required for all LMP1 cars, were also prominent choices for LMP2s and Daytona Prototypes in the new United SportsCar Championship.  The LMP1 design was therefore evolved into an LMP2 design with measures taken to assure the car met the Automobile Club de l'Ouest's (ACO) cost limitations in LMP2.  The car was designed to be able to utilize available LMP2 engines:A flat-plane crankshaft version of a Nissan V8 aluminum DOHC 4-valve engine (VK45). Judd's naturally aspirated HK V8 (BMW S65 Variant), and Honda's HPD V6 double turbo engine; (HR28TT). A high downforce sprint design and a low downforce Le Mans setup are offered for the car.

Naming of the JS P2 came about through an alliance between Onroak and Guy Ligier's partnership of Équipe Ligier and Automobiles Martini.  The JS P2 follows Ligier's naming scheme of his cars being named after French racing driver Jo Schlesser (JS).  The partnership included Onroak taking over development of Ligier-Martini's Group CN car.

Racing history

The JS P2 began initial testing in March 2014. OAK would enter two cars, one backed by Nissan's drivers and engine while the other car featured three Chinese drivers and a Honda powerplant. The third car was purchased by privateers Thiriet by TDS Racing and also used a Nissan engine. The two Nissan JS P2 qualified well, with TDS's car on pole position and the first OAK car in third. All three cars finished the 24 hour endurance with TDS in second and OAK in fifth and seventh places in class.

Following Le Mans TDS Racing campaigned their Ligier in the remainder of the European Le Mans Series, but were unable to finish the three races in which they participated.  OAK Racing meanwhile brought their Ligier to the United States for the two remaining rounds of the United SportsCar Championship, where Alex Brundle put the Honda-powered JS P2 on pole position on debut at Circuit of the Americas en route to a second-place finish.  The Nissan-powered OAK car moved to the FIA World Endurance Championship where it earned five consecutive pole positions in the five remaining races as well as class victories at Fuji Speedway and Shanghai International Circuit.

In 2015 the American Krohn Racing team purchased a JS P2 for a partial season in the United SportsCar Championship and a full season in the European Le Mans Series, and will be the first team to utilize Judd power in the Ligier.  Michael Shank Racing purchased a Honda-powered JS P2 for a full United SportsCar Championship campaign, and won pole position at the Rolex 24 at Daytona. In 2016, Extreme Speed Motorsports entered a JS P2 in the United Sportscar Championship, winning both the 2016 24 Hours of Daytona and the 2016 12 Hours of Sebring, with the JS P2 becoming the first car to defeat a Daytona Prototype at the 24 hours, as well as the team becoming the first to win the so-called "36 Hours of Florida" since 1998.

References

External links

 Onroak Automotive

Le Mans Prototypes
24 Hours of Le Mans race cars
Ligier racing cars